One ship and two shore establishments of the British Royal Navy have been named HMS Appledore, after the village in Devon.
  (1919–1920), a  minesweeper.
  (1942–1948), a Combined Operations base and training establishment at Fremington, Devon.
  (1943–1946), a Combined Operations base at Ilfracombe.

Royal Navy ship names